The 1947 Ukrainian Cup was a football knockout competition conducting by the Football Federation of the Ukrainian SSR and was known as the Ukrainian Cup.

Competition schedule

First elimination round 
All games of the round took place on 21 September 1947, and replay next day on 22 September 1947.

Second elimination round 
All games of the round took place on 28 September 1947.

Third elimination round 
All games of the round took place on 5 October 1947.

Fourth elimination round 
All games of the round took place on 12 October 1947.

Fifth elimination round 
All games of the round took place on 19 October 1947.

Quarterfinals 
Games between Dynamos and in Kherson were played on 26 October 1947, other on 1 November 1947.

Semifinals 
All games of the round took place on 2 November 1947.

Final

Top goalscorers

See also 
 Soviet Cup
 Ukrainian Cup

Notes

References

External links 
 Information source 

1947
Cup
1947 domestic association football cups